Lambdina fervidaria, the curve-lined looper or spring hemlock looper, is a moth of the  family Geometridae. It is found in Canada (Nova Scotia, Prince Edward Island, New Brunswick, Quebec, Ontario, Manitoba and Saskatchewan) and the eastern parts of the United States, south to Georgia.

The wingspan is about 27 mm. The moth flies from May to August depending on the location.

The larva feeds on Quercus and Fraxinus. The subspecies Lambdina fervidaria athasaria prefers Abies balsamea, Picea and Tsuga canadensis

Subspecies
There are two recognised subspecies:
Lambdina fervidaria fervidaria
Lambdina fervidaria athasaria (Walker, 1860)

External links
Bug Guide
Larval Stage info Lambdina fervidaria athasaria

Ourapterygini
Moths described in 1827